Robson Louis Dale is an English professional footballer who plays as a forward for Worcester City FC

Playing career
Dale came through the youth system at Cheltenham Town. In February 2013 he was loaned out to Southern League side Bishop's Cleeve alongside teammate Zack Kotwica. He made his League Two debut for Cheltenham Town on 17 August 2013, coming on for Byron Harrison 82 minutes into a 3–1 defeat to at Whaddon Road. In August 2013 he joined Bishop's Cleeve once again for a second loan spell. At the end of the season Dale signed one-year contract with Cheltenham Town.

On 5 September 2014 Dale was loaned to Conference South side Bath City on a 1-month deal. He played four times before joining Cirencester Town on another 1-month loan deal. 25 December he extended his contract till the summer 2016. 5 February Dale was loaned to Cinderford Town, initially on 1-month, later deal was prolonged to the end of the season.

Prior to the 2015/16 campaign Dale along with another Cheltenham Town youngster Harry Williams joined Isthmian League Premier Division club Farnborough on loan until January. On 4 February Dale joined National League North side Gloucester City on loan until the end of the season.

Statistics

References

External links

 

1995 births
Living people
English footballers
Association football forwards
Cheltenham Town F.C. players
Bishop's Cleeve F.C. players
Bath City F.C. players
Cirencester Town F.C. players
Cinderford Town A.F.C. players
Farnborough F.C. players
Gloucester City A.F.C. players
English Football League players
Isthmian League players